Finlay-Russel Provincial Park and Protected Area is a provincial park in British Columbia, Canada. It is part of the larger Muskwa-Kechika Management Area.

References

Peace River Regional District
Provincial parks of British Columbia
Year of establishment missing